Shobe is an extinct town in Bates County, in the U.S. state of Missouri.

A post office called Shobe was established in 1881, and remained in operation until 1899. The community has the name of Haley Shobe, an early citizen.

References

Ghost towns in Missouri
Former populated places in Bates County, Missouri